Stop It may refer to:

Stop It (single album), by B.A.P, 2012
"Stop It" (song), by Anarchic System, 1976
"Stop It", a song by French Montana from Jungle Rules, 2017